Chapchylgan (Çapçılğan) is a rural locality (a selo), the administrative centre of and one of two settlements, in addition to Promkombinat, in Chapchylgansky Rural Okrug of Amginsky District in the Sakha Republic, Russia. Its population as of the 2010 Census was 690; up from 658 recorded in the 2002 Census.

References

Notes

Sources
Official website of the Sakha Republic. Registry of the Administrative-Territorial Divisions of the Sakha Republic. Amginsky District. 

Rural localities in Amginsky District